Robert McTighe ( – 12 April 1958) was an Irish Anglican priest who was Dean of Clogher from 1950 until his death in 1958.

He was educated at Trinity College, Dublin and ordained in 1906.  After  curacies in Preston, Lancashire and Enniskillen he was the Rector at Lisbellaw until his time as Dean. He died in Enniskillen.

References

Irish Anglicans
Alumni of Trinity College Dublin
Deans of Clogher
1870s births
1958 deaths
Date of birth missing